Shobu Yarlagadda and Prasad Devineni are an Indian film producer duo. They founded Arka Media Works, a film production company known for its works in Telugu cinema. Their notable productions include Vedam (2010), Maryada Ramanna (2010), the Baahubali film series (2015–2017), and Uma Maheswara Ugra Roopasya (2020). Yarlagadda and Devineni have together garnered two National Film Awards, two state Nandi Awards, three Filmfare South Awards, two SIIMA awards, one Zee Cine Awards Telugu and the Saturn Award.

Early life 
Yarlagadda was born in Gudivada in Krishna District, Andhra Pradesh. He graduated in Civil and Environmental Engineering from Andhra University in 1992.  He went on to Texas A&M and graduated in Agricultural Engineering in 1995.  For over a year and a half, he worked as an Air Resources Engineer in Greater Los Angeles Area for California Air Resources Board. In 2001 he established Arka Mediaworks with Prasad Devineni.

Yarlagadda is the son-in-law of veteran director K. Raghavendra Rao.

Career 
In 2001, Yarlagadda established Arka Mediaworks; Arka means sunrays in Sanskrit. It produces television content in six languages (Telugu, Tamil, Kannada, Oriya, Bangla and Marathi). He has worked as line producer for films such as Morning Raaga, and Anaganaga O Dheerudu. He was Executive Producer for films such as Bobby  and Pandurangadu. Prasad Devineni produced Pallakilo Pellikoothuru.

Yarlagadda and Devineni serve as the board members of Arka Media Works, a film production company. The first part of the Telugu film has received the National Film Award for Best Feature Film, and got nominated for Saturn Award for Best Fantasy Film by the American Academy of Science Fiction, Fantasy and Horror Films. The second part has garnered the Telstra People's Choice Award at the 2017 Indian Film Festival of Melbourne. The second part, The Conclusion (2017) received the American Saturn Award for Best International Film, and the Australian Telstra People's Choice Award.

Filmography

Awards 
Indian Film Festival of Melbourne
 Telstra People's Choice Award - (Producer) - Baahubali 2: The Conclusion (2017)

National Film Awards
 National Film Award for Best Feature Film (Producer) - Baahubali: The Beginning (2015)
 Best Popular Film Providing Wholesome Entertainment - Baahubali: The Conclusion (2017)

Nandi Awards
 Nandi Award for Best Feature Film - Vedam (2010)
 Nandi Award - Best Popular Feature Film - Maryada Ramanna (2010)

Filmfare Awards South
 Filmfare Award for Best Film - Telugu - Vedam (2010)
 Filmfare Award for Best Film - Telugu - Baahubali: The Beginning (2015)
 Filmfare Award for Best Film - Telugu - Baahubali: The Conclusion (2017)

CineMAA Awards
 Best film - Maryada Ramanna (2010)
 Best film - Baahubali: The Beginning (2015)

South Indian International Movie Awards
 SIIMA Award for Best Film- Baahubali: The Beginning (2015)
 SIIMA Award for Best Film- Baahubali 2: The Conclusion(2017)

Zee Cine Awards Telugu
 Best Film - Baahubali 2: The Conclusion(2017)

Santosham Film Awards

 Best Producer - Baahubali: The Beginning (2015)

References 

Living people
Nandi Award winners
Telugu film producers
Texas A&M University alumni
Engineers from Andhra Pradesh
Film producers from Andhra Pradesh
Businesspeople from Hyderabad, India
Indian emigrants to the United States
American people of Telugu descent
People from Krishna district
Filmfare Awards South winners
Telstra People's Choice Award winners
Producers who won the Best Feature Film National Film Award
Producers who won the Best Popular Film Providing Wholesome Entertainment National Film Award
Santosham Film Awards winners
Zee Cine Awards Telugu winners
Indian filmmaking duos
Year of birth missing (living people)